The Manila Ocean Park,  also known as Ocean Park, is an oceanarium in Manila, Philippines. It is owned by China Oceanis Philippines Inc., a subsidiary of China Oceanis Inc., a Singaporean-registered firm. It is located behind the Quirino Grandstand at Rizal Park.

Construction
The construction involved erecting structural pillars at the beachfront and constructing the platform that would serve as the foundation of the entire building. The base structure and platform was completed and for a while served a secondary purpose as a promenade walkway until construction of the actual park continued.

In April 2007, the Manila Ocean Park started construction. It was initially set to open on December 15, 2007 but the opening date was then moved to February 24, 2008. The facility opened in March 2008.

E.R. Hitosis and Associates was involved in the construction management of the Manila Ocean Park.

Features

The main attraction of Manila Ocean Park is the Oceanarium which houses 14,000 sea creatures from about 277 species all of which is indigenous in Southeast Asia. The Oceanarium has seven sections and contains  of sea water. Its main feature is the  220° curved walkway tunnel after a  walkthrough inside the Oceanarium. The water used in the Oceanarium is derived from Manila Bay, which is filtered to be suitable to marine life. It also has an educational activity area, function rooms for events, and shark and stingray viewing area situated in two levels. The Jellies Exhibit, a separate attraction hosts jellyfishes. The Back of the House features information on the operation of the facility itself.

The Manila Ocean Park also hosts the Trails to Antarctica, the first penguin park facility in the country, which features Humboldt penguins. Through the years, their breeding program for the penguins have been very successful. As of May 2017, they already have a total of 13 baby penguins that hatched inside the park. They also have the Birds of Prey Kingdom which features Brahminy kites and the World of Creepy Crawlies which exhibits frogs, insects, spiders, and worms.

Services were also offered to patrons such as the Mermaid Swim Experience where visitors are taught to swim while wearing a costume mermaid tail, Underwater diving, Fish Spa, and rides on a boat with a glass bottom. Shows such as the Sea Lion Show and All Star Bird Show is performed inside the Manila Ocean Park and seats up to 1,900 pax per show.

Hotel

The Manila Ocean Park hosts a hotel on top of the Oceanarium dubbed as Hotel H2O. The hotel itself has a dedicated fitness center and spa and meeting rooms. The Makansutra Asian Food Village hosts dining outlets for its patrons.

See also
Cebu Ocean Park
On Tatay's Boat

References

External links

Buildings and structures in Ermita
Aquaria in the Philippines
Tourist attractions in Manila
2008 establishments in the Philippines